Sharlaq may refer to:
 Sharlaq, Maraveh Tappeh
 Sharlaq, Golidagh, Maraveh Tappeh